McLeod's Daughters is an Australian television drama series, created by Posie Graeme-Evans and Caroline Stanton, and produced by Millennium Television, in association with Nine Films and Television and Southern Star, for the Nine Network. The series, based on a television film  of the same name, stars Lisa Chappell and Bridie Carter as two half-sisters, reunited after twenty years of separation, when their inherit their late father's cattle station in South Australia. After three years, the show's central focus shifted from the McLeod sisters, following the departures of main cast members, and took on a more ensemble format.

Series overview

Episodes

TV Movie Pilot (1996)

Season 1 (2001-02)

Season 2 (2002)

Season 3 (2003)

Season 4 (2004)

Season 5 (2005)

Season 6 (2006)

Season 7 (2007)

Season 8 (2008-09)

References

External links
 McLeod's Daughters official website

McLeod's Daughters